Richard Leslie Burton (born 29 January 1955) is a former English cricketer.  Burton was a right-handed batsman who bowled right-arm medium pace.  He was born at Thealby, Lincolnshire.

Despite having not played any form of minor counties cricket, Burton made his List A debut for Minor Counties North against Lancashire in the 1974 Benson & Hedges Cup, scoring 5 runs in the match before he was dismissed by Clive Lloyd.  Two years later he made his debut for Lincolnshire against Staffordshire in the 1976 Minor Counties Championship.  He played minor counties cricket for Lincolnshire to 1991, making 60 Minor Counties Championship appearances, the last of which came against Staffordshire.  He also made ten MCCA Knockout Trophy appearances.  At the time, Lincolnshire were also permitted to take part in the NatWest Trophy, whose matches held List A status.  Burton played two List A matches for Lincolnshire, against Surrey in the 1983 NatWest Trophy, and Lancashire in the 1986 NatWest Trophy.

References

External links
Richard Burton at ESPNcricinfo
Richard Burton at CricketArchive

1955 births
Living people
People from Burton upon Stather
English cricketers
Lincolnshire cricketers
Minor Counties cricketers